The Zimmermann reagent is used as a simple spot-test used in chromatography to presumptively identify alkaloids, especially benzodiazepines, as well as other compounds. It is therefore used in drugs testing.

It is a two-component reagent, with the first component composed of 1,3-dinitrobenzene (1% w/v) in methanol and the second component composed of 15% potassium hydroxide in water.

One drop of each component is added to the sample being tested and the resulting colour change is observed to give an indication of the identity of the compound.

The reagent works by forming a reddish-purple Meisenheimer complex at C3 for diazepines with a carbonyl at C2 and an alkyl group at N1.  Without these groups it is not possible to form the methylene compound which reacts with dinitrobenzene but triazolo compounds may react.

It is named for the American biochemist Robert Zimmermann (b.1937).

See also
Drug checking
Dille–Koppanyi reagent
Folin's reagent
Liebermann reagent
Mandelin reagent
Marquis reagent
Mecke reagent
Simon's reagent
Zwikker reagent
Froehde reagent

References

External links
Testing Steroids

Chemical tests
Analytical reagents
Drug testing reagents